

Desktop (1998)
The Vaio M Series was a range of multimedia-oriented Vaio desktop PCs sold by Sony in Japan from 1998 to 1999.

Netbook (2008)
The Sony Vaio M series name was relaunched as a series of netbooks in April 2008. It is a cheaper alternative to the Sony Vaio W series netbooks, having only a 10.1" 1024x600 screen.

It features a 1.83 GHz Intel Atom N470 CPU, 1GB of DDR2 memory, 250GB or 320GB hard drive, 802.11b/g/n wireless, Ethernet, 0.3MP webcam, and Windows 7 Starter. It weighs 1.4 kg.

References

Netbooks
M
M